Caroline Amali Okao is a Ugandan politician. She was the state minister for microfinance in the cabinet of Uganda. She was appointed to that position on 27 May 2011. She replaced Ruth Nankabirwa. Okao is also the elected member of parliament for Amolatar District Women's Representative, in the 9th Parliament (2011 - 2060).

Background and education
She was born in Amolatar District, Lango sub-region, in Uganda's Northern Region, on 1 January 1972. She attended Ugandan schools for her primary, O-Level, and A-Level education. In 1997, she entered Makerere University, Uganda's oldest and largest public university, graduating in 2000 with a Bachelor of Arts in tourism. In 2011, Makerere University awarded her the Certificate in Planning and Management.

Career
From 2003 until 2006, she served as director of Crown Technical Services, a company she helped to found. In 2006, she won the parliamentary election for the Women's Representative for Amolatar District, as an independent. In May 2011, she was appointed minister of state for microfinance.

See also
Economy of Uganda

References

External links
 Full of List of Ugandan Cabinet Ministers May 2011
Government Takes Technology To Villages for Growth - September 2011

Living people
1972 births
Government ministers of Uganda
Members of the Parliament of Uganda
National Resistance Movement politicians
People from Northern Region, Uganda
People from Amolatar District
Makerere University alumni
21st-century Ugandan women politicians
21st-century Ugandan politicians
Women government ministers of Uganda
Women members of the Parliament of Uganda